Radtke is a German surname. Notable people with the surname include:

Charles Radtke (born 1964), American furniture maker
Dennis Radtke (born 1979), German politician
Helga Radtke (born 1962), German long and triple jumper
Jack Radtke (1913–2006), American baseball player
Katarzyna Radtke (born 1969), Polish racewalker
Kathleen Radtke (born 1985), German women's footballer
Kristen Radtke (born 1987), American writer and illustrator
Peter Radtke (born 1943), German actor and playwright
Randall J. Radtke (born 1951), American politician

German-language surnames